Omega Tribe (sometimes stylized as Ωmega Tribe) was a Japanese soft rock and city pop project that was led by producer Koichi Fujita, with the bands being handled by industry veterans Tetsuji Hayashi, Tsunehiro Izumi, and Hiroshi Shinkawa at different points of the band's existence. The project was active from the early 1980s to the late 1990s, having several hits during its lifespan with the help of lyricists, composers, and arrangers. The band underwent several core member changes as well as name changes, with the band changing vocalists three times with the introductions of Kiyotaka Sugiyama in 1983, Carlos Toshiki in 1986, and Masahito Arai in 1993. The band has also had many offshoot bands that have stemmed from members collaborating. Many of the band's works were focused on themes of summer, sea, and resorts, making them one of the leading bands with summer songs along with Southern All Stars and Tube. They have also been called one of the pioneers of Japanese soft rock in the 1980s.

History

Cutie Panchos (1978–1983)

Formation and early band activities (1978–1979) 
In December 1978, the amateur rock band Tony Taguchi & Cutie Panchos was formed by bassist and leader Masato "Tony" Taguchi (also known as "Tacohe") and guitarists Kenji Yoshida and Shinji Takashima. The band had more than a dozen people at the time of its foundation, being composed of members of a live house in Yokohama, including drummer Keiichi Hiroishi and backing singers Kumiko Nagasawa and Kimiko Mohri. Most of the members were also still attending high school at the time. Vocalist Kiyotaka Sugiyama, who had stopped perusing a career as a mangaka, joined the band with the support of his prep school teacher. The next year, the band shortened its name to Cutie Panchos as Taguchi joined another band called Larry's Papa, being the bassist of both. Keyboardist Akira Senju also joined the band as some members left.

Popular Song Contest and lineup changes (1979–1982) 
On October 7, 1979, the band participated in the 18th Yamaha Popular Song Contest (known as Popcon) with the song "My Life," written and composed by Sugiyama himself. A year after, on May 11, 1980, they participated in the 19th Popcon with the song "," which won them a prize at the contest. They later participated in the 20th Popcon on October 5, 1980 with the song "Nori Okureta 747," which was written by Gorō Matsui.

Although the band won a prize at the 19th Popcon, the band ultimately did not win the Grand Prix which was linked with an easier professional debut. Furthermore, many of the members, including Sugiyama, were not satisfied with the completeness of the song and refused a major deal offer. Because the band failed to debut, Senju left in December to have a debut of his own, taking an examination at Keio University and Tokyo University of the Arts. A year later, Nagasawa and Mohri left to form their own band called Sugar with Miki Kasamatsu.

Final lineup changes (1982–1983) 
In 1982, bassist Takao Oshima, who was acquainted with the Popcon venue and was previously a part of the band Trial Spot, joined Cutie Panchos. Keyboardist Toshitsugu Nishihara, who was active in the Yamaha Hiyoshi Center near Keio University, was scouted as a replacement for Senju while playing for the hall.

The win and refusal to debut caught the eye of producer Koichi Fujita, who watched the group during their subsequent activities in the live house. Fujita had previously been a guitarist for The Love from 1966 to 1967 and Out Cast from 1968 to 1969, and was active as a producer and as the president of Triangle Productions. He offered the band a deal that he would help them debut if they performed a song that was made by a professional composer instead of ones made by themselves, as well as straying away from their rock sound. While Sugiyama was offered a chance to be a solo vocalist, Sugiyama decided to remain in the band as their lead.

Kiyotaka Sugiyama & Omega Tribe (1983–1985)

Conception and debut (1983) 

When it came to renaming the band, Hawaiian DJ Kamasami Kong suggested the name "Omega Tribe," wanting to give them something "futuristically primitive" and could "help them lead the way into tomorrow without losing the richness of yesterday." The name was at the bottom of the list of candidates as Sugiyama suggested the name "Tixe" (a reverse spelling of the word "exit") which was liked by the band members, but Fujita ultimately picked the name "Omega Tribe," as he liked how "Omega" (Ω, ω) meant last in the Greek alphabet and that "Tribe" meant ethnicity, and interpreted as "the last companion for the final people, and you can look to the beginning of the next era." He also disliked how "Tixe" gave the feeling of a "locked color." The members also thought about if they should include "Kiyotaka Sugiyama &" before the name, and as Sugiyama did not form the core band and stood out as a lead vocalist, the name "Kiyotaka Sugiyama & Omega Tribe" was finalized.

With the name finalized, Fujita put the project under the leadership of industry veteran Tetsuji Hayashi with no instructions. The first songs Hayashi wrote for the band were "Umikaze Tsushin" and "AD 1959," but both were rejected by Fujita as it was similar to the US bands such as Journey, Orleans and Boston. Fujita wanted something more sorrowful with a "domestic melody," and after hearing Sugiyama's voice, started to write a new song with his lyricist Chinfa Kan which would become "Summer Suspicion". After it was completed, the song was given to the band to record. A month before their official debut as a band, they performed the song at the 12th Tokyo Music Festival on March 27, 1983.

It was initially planned for Kiyotaka Sugiyama & Omega Tribe to be on BMG Victor, but Hayashi had introduced Fujita to the director of VAP and they agreed to a contract. The band officially made their debut on April 21, 1983 with the release of "Summer Suspicion" under the VAP label. The song came when the tropical atmosphere in songs were well received in Japan but did poorer than expected during its first couple months, only selling around 260,000 copies and charting at No. 9 on the Oricon charts. Even with a lackluster performance, VAP supported the band by forming contracts with Nippon TV so that they could appear on shows. With the single out, most of the members had mixed feelings about being a band with the producers doing most of the work. Takao Oshima proposed to break up after the first single but was dissuaded by Sugiyama, although he also had mixed feelings as well.

The band then started production on what would become Aqua City with Hayashi doing most of the composition. Kan and fellow lyricist Yasushi Akimoto both wrote for the album with Tsugutoshi Gotō and Ken Shiguma helping with arrangement. The goal of the album was to create the band's new identity as a summer pop band, using a collection of songs with themes of summer, the beach, and the sea. The album released on September 21, 1983, charting at No. 4 on the Oricon charts.

On October 21, the band released their second single, "Asphalt Lady", which had a spike in sales initially but stopped at 60,000 sales, doing even worse than "Summer Suspicion" at No. 32 on the charts. The production team realized that the song was "more Japanese than the debut song" and didn't have the summer atmosphere that many heard in their first single and album, so the team started work on the next single that would have the ocean theme.

River's Island and Never Ending Summer (1984) 
Kan and Hayashi then wrote "Kimi no Heart wa Marine Blue" made with the image of summer and youth in mind. During the recording, Fujita expressed disappointment in Sugiyama as he couldn't get the voice right for the image. Sugiyama re-recorded parts of the song many times after to get the vocals right. The song was released on January 21, 1984, first appearing at No. 72 before climbing up the charts and charting at No. 12 with 249,000 copies. The song was also used as the opening for the Tokyo Broadcasting System drama . The two singles were included in their second album, River's Island, which took a different approach to their sound by imitating the West Coast-style with the image of the city. The album did well, charting at No. 3 on the Oricon charts.

The band then started to work on their third album, Never Ending Summer, releasing their fourth single "Riverside Hotel" on October 21, 1984. The single charted at No. 21, doing worse than " Marine Blue." Never Ending Summer completed its production on November 2 and was released on December 21. The album also did worse than its predecessor, charting at No. 8, but exceeded it in terms of sales. Sugiyama composed all of the A-side except for "Riverside Hotel" while the B-side was written by Hayashi and Akimoto.

Final albums and disbandment (1985) 
On March 6, 1985, the single Futari no Natsu Monogatari was released after being recorded in three days. The song was a commercial tie-up with Japan Airlines, with the inspiration of the song coming from an advertisement slogan given to Hayashi. He began writing and composing the song in two days while the members were on tour with the members taking a one-day break to record the song. The song was the band's biggest hit record, selling more than 10,000 copies and charting at No. 4 on the Oricon charts. During their peak of popularity from the success of the single, Sugiyama proposed that the band break up for good. Although the members had a good relationship, Oshima, Hiroishi, and Yoshida still had the discomfort from the producers doing most of the work and agreed to disband. On the other hand, Takashima and Nishihara opposed to the disbandment since they wouldn't have a clear direction after the disbandment, but conceded once it was clear that they were the minority. The band decided that a compilation album would serve as their last album and that they would disband near the end of the year.

The band started production of their fourth studio album, Another Summer, cutting down on the orchestral and brass sound and replacing it with the Moog Polymoog and the Yamaha DX7. In April 1985, Kenji Yoshida left the band during the production as he grew impatient with the disbandment near the end of the year. The band completed the album on May 20, 1985. A day after its completion, the band released the Kamasami Kong DJ Special, which included songs from Aqua City and River's Island and was narrated by Kong. A couple of days later, the single "Silence Ga Ippai" was released. Another Summer was released on July 1, 1985 and gave the band their first No. 1 album on the Oricon charts. The album also included their only collaboration with the song "You're A Lady, I'm A Man" with Rajie. Fujita was notified of their decision by Sugiyama, and although saddened, agreed to let them disband. Fujita had gotten success with producing for Momoko Kikuchi and decided that those who wanted to leave could leave and the ones who wanted to stay could stay with a new vocalist.

On October 4, the band started their final tour, releasing Single's History on October 23. Hayashi, who was informed by Fujita himself about the disbandment, met with Sugiyama one night to try to make him reconsider the disbandment. He wanted to prolong the time of the band since they had many hit records and had a smooth sailing career, but Sugiyama did not reverse his decision. As a final wish, Hayashi requested that the group make a final album for the fans, giving the album the title First Finale. On November 7, the band released their final single "Glass no Palm Tree," which according to Fujita was an answer song to "Summer Suspicion." The song was also a commercial tie-up for the coffee company DyDo. First Finale was released on December 11 during their tour, giving the band their second No. 1 album. Days later, on December 24, the band would officially break up following a performance at the Tokyo Shinjuku Welfare Pension Hall. The band's final concert was made into the album Live Emotion in 1986. The narration of the album was handed by two women, one of them being Yuko Yanagisawa, the sister of comedian Shingo Yanagisawa and Sugiyama's wife during that time.

1986 Omega Tribe (1986–1988)

Formation (1985–1986) 
With the impending disbandment of S. Kiyotaka & Omega Tribe, Fujita had started searching for a potential new vocalist for the members who wanted to stay. Fujita was then handed a demo tape from Japanese Brazilian vocalist Carlos Toshiki, a dishwasher who had unsuccessfully tried to get into the music business years before. Fujita was impressed with his voice and considered him a promising candidate for production as a solo artist or part of another band, and invited Toshiki to VAP's studio to meet him in person. Toshiki was then asked to sing a song from S. Kiyotaka & Omega Tribe, choosing to sing "" without thinking that the meeting was an audition. After singing, Fujita gave him the opportunity to become the next vocalist of Omega Tribe instead of being a solo act, as well as receiving vocal and Japanese lessons before his debut. Toshiki also was present at S. Kiyotaka & Omega Tribe's First Finale Tour. Fujita also wanted another member for the band, picking a guitarist from Momoko Kikuchi's and Hiromi Iwasaki's backing bands named Mitsuya Kurokawa. Fujita appointed him as the bandleader for 1986 Omega Tribe.

Debut with "" and Navigator (1986) 
With the band formed, the band now needed a debut single that resonated with the public, as they had faced pressure with the absence of Sugiyama. Many of the writers and composers from the previous band had also left, including Hayashi, Kan, and Akimoto, and were replaced by new members of the production team like Masao Urino and Hiroshi Shinkawa. Fujita invited Toshiki to Hawaii to talk about his life between Brazil and Japan, and asked Toshiki if there were any similarities between the Portuguese and Japanese. Toshiki replied by saying that the Japanese word for 1000 was pronounced , which was similar to the Portuguese word for 100, pronounced . Fujita thought that it was interesting, and called lyricist Masako Arikawa to write lyrics using  in the chorus. The title "" was made after the writing of the lyrics.

"Kimi wa 1000%" was released on May 1, 1986 and was a hit record, charting at No. 6 on the Oricon chart and selling 293,220 copies. The song was used as the theme song of the drama , which starred Ikue Sakakibara, and helped boost the popularity of the band. The band released their debut album Navigator on July 23, 1986, reaching No. 2 on the charts and selling 433,590 copies.

On August 7, 1986, the band released their second single, "Super Chance", which charted at No. 2 on the Oricon charts. The single also won the band's first and only No. 1 spot on TBS's The Top Ten and was a commercial tie-up with Fujifilm, using the song for their "Super Fujicolor" commercials that starred Yoko Minamino. As a commemoration, the band was invited on the program  and made Toshiki call his parents, surprising him with their appearance as they had secretly flown to Japan from Brazil. It was the first time he had met with them for six years. On October 15, 1986, the band released their third single "Cosmic Love," which charted No. 3 on the Oricon charts and No. 2 on The Best Ten. The song had a faster tempo than the previous two singles, as well as a space theme instead of the usual summer atmosphere.

Crystal Night and Kurokawa's departure (1987)

The band started production on their second album, Crystal Night near the end of 1986, with the production team showing an interest in electric sounds based on American black contemporary music, as with many other artists at the time. The album used digital synths, analog synths, and samplers along with digital reverb by arrangers who specialized in sound design, such as Motoki Funayama and Hiroshi Shinkawa. Crystal Night was released on February 4, 1987, charting at No. 2 on the Oricon chart. The band were also awarded a Japan Gold Disc Award for Navigator.

Their last album before the rename, DJ Special, was released on June 21, 1987. The album is a compilation album inspired by Kamasami Kong's Kamasami Kong DJ Special for Kiyotaka Sugiyama & Omega Tribe in 1985, featuring Kong's fellow KIKI radio DJ Ron Wiley. A single, "Brilliant Summer," was recorded as a promotional single for the compilation and was the first time it included American backing vocalists and studio musicians. A month later, July 15, 1987, they released the single "Miss Lonely Eyes" which peaked at No. 2 on the Oricon charts and The Top Ten as well as No. 3 on The Best Ten.

The band's last single as 1986 Omega Tribe, "Stay Girl Stay Pure," was released on October 18, 1987 and peaked at No. 5 on the Oricon charts. The single was more jazz-inspired and had more Western influence than all of the other singles. Sometime after the release of the single, Kurokawa stopped playing the guitar and left the band due to health issues.

Carlos Toshiki & Omega Tribe (1988–1990)

Name change and McCoy's addition (1988) 
With Kurokawa leaving, Toshiki, Takashima, and Nishihara were the remaining members of the band. The production team decided to rename the group to "Carlos Toshiki & Omega Tribe," as the "1986" in the name was getting old by 1988 and they also wanted to boost Toshiki's presence within the band. Kurokawa left during the production of Down Town Mystery, which would turn into the band's debut album after their name change. The production was helped by Americans like Marty Bracey and Wornell Jones, as well as other studio musicians like Teruo Gotō; all of them had worked with Omega Tribe in 1987.

On March 6, 1988, they released the title single "Down Town Mystery," which included a "Daylight Version" and a "Nighttime Version" which were mixed differently by Eiji Uchinuma and Kunihiko Shimizu respectively. The "Nighttime Version" was used as the A-side. The album Down Town Mystery was released on April 6, 1988 in the "Daylight" and "Nighttime" versions. On August 10, 1988, the band released "Aquamarine no Mama de Ite", a tie-up with the Fuji TV drama ! The song was arranged with help of American trumpeter Jerry Hey. The song was less successful than previous singles, but come to be the band's most popular song with the help of the drama, peaking at No. 3 on the charts.

As the band continued as a trio, the production team's attention was turned to a backing vocalist named Joey McCoy. McCoy was one of the Americans who joined during the production of Down Town Mystery and sang the chorus for "." Influenced by McCoy's singing skills, McCoy was given an opportunity to join as the band's fourth member and to release a track where he was the lead vocalist. Four months later, the band released "Reiko," sung by McCoy, on November 10, 1988 and featured more Western influence and a stronger synth-pop style than the band's typical soft rock style. They also released an English version, with Jerry Hey helping with the arrangement for both. The original Japanese version peaked at No. 15 while the English version peaked at No. 78.

Be Yourself and declining popularity (1989) 
On February 8, 1989, the band released their second album Be Yourself, which sold well at No. 9 on the charts. Hey also helped with arrangement and was joined by Tetsuji Hayashi and Kiyotaka Sugiyama as composers. Even with the return of Hayashi and Sugiyama, many felt that some of the songs were unsatisfactory. Months later, on July 21, 1989, they released their fourth single, "Dōshite Suki to Itte Kurenai no," which peaked at No. 24. On September 5, 1989, they released their fifth single "Hana no Furu Gogo," the theme song for the movie Hana no Furu Gogo. The song peaked at No. 26 in the charts. "" was included on their third album, Bad Girl, which was released on September 21 and peaked at No. 26 on the charts. Bad Girl had lyricists appointed from "" as well as Yasushi Akimoto and Yasuharu Konishi.

Many fans disliked the band's shift away from their typical soft rock and city pop sound and the inconsistency between singles and albums. With this, Fujita's feelings about the band began to change, with the band's peak on the Oricon chart slowly dropping.

Label change, final concert, and disbandment (1990–1991) 
In 1990, the band transferred from VAP to Warner Pioneer for unknown reasons, releasing the single "Toki wa Kagerō" on June 25, 1990 under the new label as well as rereleasing all Carlos Toshiki & Omega Tribe songs and albums under Warner. The single was written by Yumi Matsutoya and would be their last single. Two days later, the band would release their final album Natsuko on July 27, 1990. The cover art was handled by Mineko Ueda with Akimoto returning as lyricist.

On December 14, 1990, after a performance of "" on Music Station, the band announced they would be disbanding following a final tour. 
The tour was held from February 21, 1991 to March 16, 1991, and after the final performance at Nissin Power Station, the band broke up. A live album of one of the performances at Shibuya Public Hall was released as The Graduate Live on April 10, 1991.

Brand New Omega Tribe (1993–1994) 

In 1993, a fourth and final iteration of Omega Tribe was formed by Fujita called Brand New Omega Tribe (shortened to BNOT). Unlike the previous versions of the band, BNOT consisted only of Masahito Arai, who was previously the lead vocalist of the group Pal and had started his solo career in 1986. Masahito met with Fujita and agreed to be the new vocalist for Omega Tribe after the break up of Carlos Toshiki & Omega Tribe two years before. Instead of other members performing the instrumentals, the songs were produced by Fujita and his production team with the help of studio musicians Tsunehiro, Shinkawa and Urino. Other studio musicians included Wornell Jones from Carlos Toshiki & Omega Tribe, Kaori Nishina of Twin Fizz, and Masato Honda of T-Square. Masahito also talked with Sugiyama during his time as the singer of BNOT. The band released their first single "" on August 2, 1993.

On January 2, 1994, the project released their last single, "Marry Me", and released their only studio album Beach Hippies on January 25, 1994. Both the single and album were unsuccessful as their counterparts, so the project broke up after the album's release.

Later activities (1994–present) 
Kiyotaka Sugiyama & Omega Tribe, 1986 Omega Tribe, and Carlos Toshiki & Omega Tribe have released multiple compilation albums since 1991, including a joint album with Omega Tribe History: Goodbye Omega Tribe 1983–1991 in 1991.

In 2004, S. Kiyotaka & Omega Tribe reunited for the first time in 19 years for the First Finale 2 Tour, which took place from February 11, 2004 to February 15, 2004 at the NHK Hall. A video of the concert was released as a DVD. In 2016, the band's entire discography and some of their compilation albums were made available on digital streaming services. In 2010, the BNOT album Beach Hippies was made available on digital streaming services.

In 2018, S. Kiyotaka & Omega Tribe released the 35th Anniversary All Singles collection that included all their singles, the Kamasami Kong DJ Special as well as a DVD version of Single Vacation. That same year, the band reunited to celebrate their anniversary, playing at both the Hannō City Hall on May 3 and Hibiya Open-Air Concert Hall on May 5. An album of the concert was released as The Open Air Live "High & High 2018" Complete, charting at No. 66 on the Oricon charts. After the concert, it was announced that the band would have a national tour in 2019 and that it would be their last. The tour, named the "Last Live Tour," started in February with their final performance on at Kanagawa Kenmin Hall was broadcast on Wowow on April 21. That same year, the band released the remix album Omega Tribe Groove, with the remixes handled by Eiji Uchinuma and Mizuo Miura.

In 2020, S. Kiyotaka & Omega Tribe released their first 7-inch analog box that included all of their singles as well as a remixed single. The box also included a special booklet containing dialogue written by Sugiyama, Hayashi, and Shgkuma. In December 2020, 1986 Omega Tribe and VAP announced an anniversary compilation album called To Your Summertime Smile to be released on February 24, 2021.

On May 9, 2021, S. Kiyotaka & Omega Tribe held a live broadcast concert as the concerts planned in 2020 were cancelled due to the COVID-19 pandemic in Japan. On July 28, 2021, VAP announced a remix project for Aqua City that would release on September 29, 2021, nearing the 40th anniversary of S. Kiyotaka & Omega Tribe in 2023.

One-offs and offshoot bands

Deconstructed Omega by Mints Entertainment (1992) 
After the disbandment of Carlos Toshiki & Omega Tribe the year before, Nishihara wondered what he would do as he was jobless. Nishihara decided to contact Takashima to form another band, calling it Deconstructed Omega by Mints Entertainment or DOME for short. They selected amateur vocalist Satoshi Mikami as the lead singer, also hiring bassist Shoichi Sakauchi and drummer Michihisa Ikeda for the band.

On May 1, 1992, the band released their only single, "," which was used as the theme song for the information program Time3. Three weeks later, on May 21, 1992, the band released their only album DOME to little success. The album was arranged by Ken Shiguma, who had arranged for S. Kiyotaka & Omega Tribe, and featured Tetsuya Osaka, a second keyboardist for S. Kiyotaka & Omega Tribe and C. Toshiki & Omega Tribe. The band had a live house tour and broke up.

Weather Side (1994–1996) 
In 1994, Takashima and Nishihara once again teamed up to form a final offshoot. They selected Hideaki Takatori as the band's vocalist and started production on new songs. The band was produced by Seiji Kameda, who also contributed with bass, while the drums were handled by Nobuo Eguchi.

The band released three singles and three albums before breaking up.

W Omega (2008–2009) 
In 2008, Arai Masahito and Mitsuya Kurokawa formed W Omega (also called Double Omega) after meeting together and decided to focus on live performances. The group also included Takeshi Ogawa and Tadamasa Momota. In 2009, they released their first single "Triangle." On July 4, 2009, the band released their first album Again.

Santa Kaniyoshi (2009–present) 
In 2009, Takashima, Yoshida, and Oshima formed the band Health Hawks (ヘルスホークス) alongside April Band's Yoshiura Yoshikazu on drums and actor Takayuki Katō, the son of Kazuko Kurosawa and the grandson of filmmaker Akira Kurosawa through his and actor Daisuke Katō through his father, on vocals. The band later renamed themselves to Santa Kaniyoshi (サンタカニヨシ).

Jyuro x Omega (2012) 
In 2012, Takao Oshima and Kenji Yoshida collaborated with pianist Jyuryo Gen on his second album "." To commemorate the release, the group played live at the Moon Romantic on the day of its release, previously playing a pre-live at Flamingo the Arusha on November 15.

Kumi's Band (2014–2015)
In 2015, singer Kumiko Nagasawa, who was a part of Cutie Panchos and Sugar, restarted her musical career in 2010, with her first album Kumi's Band released in 2015. Her backing band for the album and concerts included Takashima, Yoshida, Hiroishi, and Taguchi.

B-EDGE (2015–present) 

In 2015, drummer Marty Bracey, bassist Wornell Jones, and saxophonist Teruo Gotō formed the offshoot band B-EDGE, focusing on a jazz sound. They released their first album, Easy Loving You that same year. In 2017, Carlos Toshiki joined the group as a lead vocalist, coming out of his 22-year musical retirement. The group temporarily renamed themselves Carlos Toshiki & B-Edge, referencing Carlos Toshiki & Omega Tribe as Bracey, Jones, and Gotō were also studio musicians during that era. The band released the album Nova Nostalgia and toured under that name until 2019, when Toshiki left Japan to go back to Brazil. The album peaked at No. 113 on the Oricon chart.

In 2020, they released their third album, .

Band members

Discography

Tours and performances

Kiyotaka Sugiyama & Omega Tribe 
Domestic Tour '84	(March 21, 1984 – May 8, 1984)
1st Pop Hill Festival at Tatsunokuchi Hill Park (1984)
Summer Sunset Concert Tour (November 28, 1984 – March 12, 1985)
Live Aid (July 13, 1985)
First Finale Tour (October 4, 1985 – December 24, 1985)
First Finale 2 ~Omega and Live~ at the NHK Hall (February 11, 2004 – February 15, 2004)
The Open Air Live "High & High 2018" Pre Live at Hanno City Hall (May 3, 2018)
The Open Air Live "High & High 2018" Complete at Hibiya Open-Air Concert Hall (May 5, 2018)
Last Live Tour (February 2, 2019 – April 21, 2019)

1986 Omega Tribe 
Eye Bank Charity Concert at Nagoya Broadcasting Network (July 10, 1986)
Concert from Television Niigata Network for Nippon TV (August 16, 1986)
1st School Festival Tour (October 3, 1986 – December 1, 1986)
First Domestic Tour (January 13, 1987 – April 18, 1987)
Summer Event Tour (July 11, 1987 – August 26, 1987)
Save The Children Concert for Nippon TV (August 22, 1987)
2nd School Festival Tour (October 10, 1987 – November 30, 1987)
Omega Tribe Youth 1000% for Nippon Cultural Broadcasting (October 12, 1986)
Second Tour (September 12, 1987 – January 30, 1989)

Carlos Toshiki & Omega Tribe 
1st Event Tour (June 4, 1988 – August 27, 1988)
Omega Tribe Youth 1000%/Omega Tribe In Hawaii Tour for Nippon Cultural Broadcasting (July 10, 1988)
1st School Festival Tour (October 2, 1988 – November 12, 1988)
2nd School Festival Tour (November 27, 1988 – March 29, 1989)
2nd Event Tour (June 24, 1989 – July 24, 1989)
Be Yourself Tour (November 27, 1988 – March 29, 1989)
Mandom Live Special at Nippon Budokan (December 20, 1988)
3rd Event Tour (June 24, 1989)
3r School Festival Tour (October 6, 1988 – November 12, 1988)
Heart of Fire (November 27, 1989 – April 27, 1990)
Shinjuku / Nissin Power Station (October 12, 1990)
School Festival Event Tour (September 30, 1990 – October 28, 1990)
NACK5 Live Special at the Nisshin Power Station (1990)
Chiba Expo '90 at Makuhari Messe (November 24, 1990)
Xmas Live (December 23, 1990 – December 25, 1990)
Dissolution Concert Tour (February 21, 1991 – March 16, 1991)

Awards

References

External links 
Discogs for S. Kiyotaka & Omega Tribe, 1986 Omega Tribe, D.O.M.E., Carlos Toshiki And Omega Tribe, Brand New Omega Tribe, Weather Side and きゅうてぃぱんちょす.

J-pop music groups
1983 in Japanese music